John Doyle may refer to:

The arts and entertainment
 John Doyle (Canadian artist) (born 1950), Toronto artist
 John Doyle (comedian) (born 1953), Australian comedian and writer
 John Doyle (critic) (born 1957), Canadian television critic
 John Doyle (director) (born 1953), British theatre director
 John Doyle (drummer) (born 1959), drummer for bands Magazine and the Armoury Show
 John Doyle (Irish artist) (1797–1868), Irish artist and grandfather of Arthur Conan Doyle
 John Doyle, Irish musician with Solas and Usher's Island
 John Doyle, a pen-name of Robert Graves

Military
 John Doyle (British Army soldier) (1828–1892), Irish cavalryman in the Charge of the Light Brigade
 John Doyle (RAF officer) (1895–1974), British World War I flying ace
 John Milley Doyle (1781–1856), Anglo-Irish soldier

Politics
Sir John Doyle, 1st Baronet (1756–1834), Irish officer, Lieutenant-Governor of Guernsey, Private Secretary to George IV
John Doyle (Australian politician) (1875–1951), New South Wales politician
John Doyle (West Virginia politician) (born 1942), member of the West Virginia House of Delegates
John H. Doyle (1844–1919), Republican politician in the U.S. State of Ohio
John Paul Doyle (born 1942), American politician in the New Jersey General Assembly

Sports
 John Doyle (baseball) (1858–1915), Canadian Major League Baseball player
 Jack Doyle (baseball) (1869–1958), American baseball player
 Jack Doyle (boxer) (1913–1978), Irish boxer and actor
 John Doyle (Carlow hurler) (born 1992), Irish hurler
 John Doyle (rugby league) (born 1977), Australian
 John Doyle (soccer, born 1946), Australian 
 John Doyle (soccer, born 1966), American
 John Doyle (Tipperary hurler) (1930–2010), Irish
 John Joe Doyle (1906–2000), Irish hurler
 Johnny Doyle (Gaelic footballer) (born 1977), Kildare
 Johnny Doyle (hurler) (born 1957), Irish former hurler
 Johnny Doyle (Scottish footballer) (1951–1981), Scottish footballer for Celtic F.C.

Others
 John Doyle (announcer), American announcer whose voice is used by the National Institute of Standards and Technology radio station WWV
 John Doyle (engineer), American control theorist, professor at California Institute of Technology
 John Doyle (judge) (born 1945), Chief Justice of South Australia
 John Doyle (police officer) (died 1913), New Zealand police officer killed in the line of duty
 John Andrew Doyle (1844–1907), English historian

See also
John Doyle Group, British civil engineering contractor
Jack Doyle (disambiguation)